Suq Bayt Naʽam, also called simply Bayt Naʽam and known historically as Bayt Anʽam, is a village in Hamdan District of Sanaa Governorate, Yemen. It is located at the uppermost part of the Wadi Dahr, where the water from the catchment area above Lu'lu'ah descends into the wadi through a narrow gorge, overlooked by a fort. The road from Sanaa to Shibam Kawkaban passes through here.

History 
Bayt Naʽam is called Bayt Anʽam in historical texts from the middle ages and early modern period. Its fort was frequently contested throughout the period, including one occasion in 612 AH (1215 CE) mentioned by Yaqut al-Hamawi as well as in the Ghayat al-amani of Yahya ibn al-Husayn.

References 

Villages in Sanaa Governorate